The Montreal Executive Committee is the executive branch of the municipal government of Montreal, Quebec, Canada. The committee reports directly to city hall and is responsible for generating documents such as budgets and by-laws, which are then sent to the Montreal City Council for approval. As of 2017, the committee consists of the mayor of Montreal, twelve members, and five associate members.

After the 2009 municipal election, mayor Gérald Tremblay broke with a longstanding tradition and appointed two members of opposition parties to the committee. Tremblay also broke with precedent in naming himself as chair of the committee. Following Tremblay's resignation in November 2012, interim mayor Michael Applebaum also took a cross-partisan approach, naming a coalition committee with representatives from all three party caucuses as well as the bloc of independent councillors. When Laurent Blanchard, the chair of the executive committee under Applebaum, succeeded Applebaum as mayor in June 2012, he made only minor changes to the executive committee, adding one new member to fill the vacant seat.

Following an offer made during the 2017 election, Mayor Valérie Plante named one opposition member to the council, Verdun borough mayor Jean-François Parenteau of Équipe Coderre. However, he chose to leave the party and sit as an independent.

Members
There are fifteen members of the executive committee, including the mayor, and five associate councillors.

2013-2017 Executive Council
Council under mayor Denis Coderre from November 14, 2013 – November 16, 2017.

References

Municipal government of Montreal